Five Star Bank is an American Community Business Bank founded in 1999 in Rocklin, California by prominent real estate developers Buzz Oates and Frank Ramos. Five Star Bank was originally created after the two recognized a need for relationship-based commercial real estate banking services in the region around the state capital. Five Star Bank became a public company in May 2021 and is traded on the Nasdaq under FSBC.

In 2018, Five Star Bank was named the 46th highest performing community bank in the United States under $3 billion in assets by S&P Global. The bank was also named the 21st most active SBA 7(A) lender in the country by total loans and 65th by volume among all banks through the first half of 2019 by the SBA.

Five Star Bank has seven locations in the California capital region located in Roseville, Elk Grove, Rancho Cordova, Sacramento/Natomas, Yuba City, Chico, Redding, and two Loan Production Offices located in Downtown Sacramento and Santa Rosa. In 2018, Five Star Bank moved its headquarters to its current Roseville location.

Five Star Bank is known for its engagement among the communities it serves. The bank specializes in these niche markets:
 Manufactured Housing & Storage
SBA
 Commercial Real Estate
 Construction
 Agriculture & Ag-Tech
 Faith Community
 Government
 Healthcare
 Manufacturing & Distribution
Non-profit
 Professional Services & Practice
 Venture Banking & Technology

RISE Program
Five Star Bank is a major participant in the RISE Program (Responsible Investment for a Stronger Economy), founded by Region Business. This program aims to get local governments of cities, counties, and districts to deposit with local community banks, with the assurance that the banks will invest a portion of the money back into businesses in the region.

Those invested in Five Star Bank through the RISE Program include: The Cities of Rocklin, Sacramento, Roseville, Rancho Cordova, Elk Grove, and SMUD.

Five Star Bank Tank
On March 29, 2018, Five Star Bank held its inaugural Five Star Bank Tank. This event helps to connect start-ups with investors in the Sacramento region. 23 start-up companies were present, with Grin and AltWork being selected as the event's top-presenting companies.

On October 31, 2018, and again on October 19, 2021, the company hosted  ive Star Bank Tank with plans to host more events in the future.

References

External links 
 Official site

Banks based in California
Banks established in 1999
1999 establishments in California
American companies established in 1999